Year book may refer to:
 Yearbook, a book to record, highlight, and commemorate the past year of a school
 The Year Books, the earliest law reports of England